DRUJ may refer to:
 Distal radioulnar joint, a synovial pivot-type joint between the two bones in the forearm: the radius and ulna
 Druj, the opposite of Zoroastrian concept of asha, 𐬛𐬭𐬎𐬘 druj, "deceit, falsehood"